Martha Sundquist State Forest is a Tennessee state forest located in Cocke County near Hartford. The forest was named in honor of former Tennessee governor Don Sundquist's wife, Martha.  The forest consists primarily of mature mountain and cove hardwood stands, and is surrounded on three sides by the federally-managed Cherokee National Forest.

History
The forest was created in 2001 when the state purchased  from the International Paper Company (formerly Champion International).

Features
The forest features a hiking trail called "Tennessee Gulf Trail".

Tree types found in the forest include eastern hemlock, magnolia, maple, birch, and white pine.

References

External links

Protected areas of Cocke County, Tennessee
Tennessee state forests